According to Akilathirattu Ammanai the holy text of Ayyavazhi the present universe has eight aeons and we are in the seventh aeon, Kali Yukam.

In the sixth aeon called Dwapara Yukam, the fifth fragment of Kroni, the primordial personification of evil, was apportioned into hundred pieces, and made into Thuriyothanan and ninety-nine brothers to support him. The three brothers of Raman, along with Vibushanan  and Sampoovan of the preceding epoch, were created as Pancha Pandavas in this aeon. In the battle drawn between the forces of Thuriyothanan and Panchapantavarkal, the wicked Thuriyothanan was killed by the later with the support of Mayon who came in the form of Krishnan. Even at the point of death Thuriyothanan refuse to repent, saying that, "only with your cunning mind you was able to defeat me and otherwise not". Lord Narayana then told him: You will be created with knowledge, intelligence, and artistic skills in the next Yukam, and if you do not repent in that age, that will be your eternal annihilation.

See also
Dvapara Yuga
List of Ayyavazhi-related articles

Ayyavazhi mythology
Eight Yugas